A list of American films released in 1979.

Kramer vs. Kramer won the Academy Award for Best Picture and was the highest-grossing film of 1979.



0-9 to A

B-G

H-M

N-S

T-Z

See also
 1979 in American television
 1979 in the United States

External links

1979 films at the Internet Movie Database

1979
Films
Lists of 1979 films by country or language